Opostegoides sinevi is a moth of the family Opostegidae. It was described by Koslov in 1985. It is known from the Russian Far East.

Adults have been recorded in May.

References

Opostegidae
Moths described in 1985